Airyantha is a small genus of flowering plants in the legume family, Fabaceae. It belongs to the subfamily Faboideae. It was named after the botanist Herbert Kenneth Airy Shaw. It was traditionally assigned to the tribe Sophoreae; however, recent molecular phylogenetic analyses reassigned Airyantha into the Baphieae tribe.

References 

Baphieae
Fabaceae genera